Lajos Csordák (2 February 1864 in Kassa, Kingdom of Hungary – 28 June 1937 in Kosice, Czechoslovakia) was a Hungarian painter.

Csordák started to study painting around 1880. In 1883, his whole family moved to Munich. From 1889 to 1895 he studied at Academy of Fine Arts, Prague, under the guidance of Czech landscape painter Julius Mařák, and became a member of the artistic group Mánes Union of Fine Arts. After 1908, he lived permanently in Kassa.

In painting he specialised on landscapes using dry materials pastels. He was influenced by impressionism in his works.

External links
 Very short biography (in Slovak)
 Self-portrait 
 Works held in Slovak art collections

1864 births
1937 deaths
Landscape artists
19th-century Hungarian painters
20th-century Hungarian painters
Hungarian male painters
19th-century Hungarian male artists
20th-century Hungarian male artists